Lac au Saumon (Salmon Lake) is a fresh water body located in the Matapédia Valley. It is situated in La Matapédia Regional County Municipality in the Bas-Saint-Laurent region of Quebec, Canada.

References 

Saumon